The Admiral Theatre is a movie theater and historic landmark in the North Admiral neighborhood of West Seattle, Washington, United States. It was originally a second-run theater, but has since switched to showing new releases.

History

The building dates to 1919 and was originally known as the Portola Theatre. With a somewhat nautical theme, the face of the theater sported two portholes. The Portola's screen was equipped with a lighting system, able to enhance the otherwise black and white scenes with hints of color, and a theater organ to provide music for silent films.

The Portola Theatre was bought in 1938 by John Danz. It was then remodeled and renamed to the Admiral Theatre, a name chosen by popular vote courtesy of West Seattleites. The Admiral Theatre officially opened January 22, 1942. This 802-seat theater was designed by the noted cinema architect, B. Marcus Priteca. Eventually, the theater was sold by John Danz to Cineplex. Finding itself in a state of neglect and losing money quickly, the theater announced it would be closing its doors. However, the Historical Society of Seattle got involved to help save the building, leading to the establishment of the theater as a landmark. In 1992, the Admiral was ready to reopen and continue business as a second-run theater. The Admiral was sold in June 2008, to Faraway Entertainment, a group based in Bainbridge Island, Wash. Admiral Entertainment, LLC, manages the movie house.

Events 
Alongside showing movies, the Admiral has been the host of performers, shows, and special events. For over ten years, The Rocky Horror Picture Show was performed regularly, with the last showing taking place on November 1, 2014. The Admiral Theatre was also frequented by J. P. Patches, a prominent local clown. The theater also hosts the Mommy Matinee, held regularly as an opportunity for parents and guardians to bring in their young children to watch a movie, but without the stress or worry of disrupting fellow viewers.

Decor  

Having expanded upon the Portola, the Admiral kept the original nautical theme and even expanded upon it over time. The auditoriums are labeled by "pier", green seahorses accompany the exit signs, the employee's room is known as "the crew's quarters", and the two portholes once decorating the exterior of the Portola can now be viewed just above the Admiral's lobby. Artwork brings the walls to life as well, entering the theater, you are greeted by a 1942 mural of George Vancouver behind the concession stand, spanning from floor to ceiling. In 1997, the theater added another nautical twist by hiring muralist, Jeff Greene, to paint an underwater scene in one of the auditoriums. These scenes are still visible with potential to be restored.

Renovation 
The theater has gone through many renovations and changes, starting with the initial remodel to prepare for the new Admiral Theatre's grand opening in 1942. In 1973, the Admiral was split into two auditoriums. In 2017, the theater opted for another renovation, turning the two theaters into a total of four. This build included an update with luxury seating, a higher quality sound system, and 3D effects.

References

External links

B. Marcus Priteca buildings
Buildings and structures in Seattle
1940s architecture in the United States
Cinemas and movie theaters in Washington (state)
Streamline Moderne architecture in Washington (state)
Theatres on the National Register of Historic Places in Washington (state)
West Seattle, Seattle
National Register of Historic Places in Seattle
Theatres completed in 1942
1942 establishments in Washington (state)